Lists of dynasties include:

 List of dynasties, sorted by geographic region

By ethnicity 
 Iranian
 Jewish
 Kurdish
 Maratha
 Mongol
 Pashtun
 Turkic

By caste 
 Brahmin
 Jat
 Rajput

By region/state 
 Arabia
 China
 Egypt
 Ireland
 Mesopotamia
 Roman Empire
 United Arab Emirates
 Vietnam

By religion 
 Buddhist
 Confucian
 Hasidic
 Hindu
 Islamic
 Iran
 Shia
 Sunni
 Jain
 Tengrist
 Zoroastrian

Other 
 List of noble houses